Smoking in Turkey is banned in government offices, workplaces, bars, restaurants, cafés, shopping malls, schools, hospitals, and all forms of public transport, including trains, taxis and ferries.  Turkey's smoking ban includes provisions for violators, where anyone caught smoking in a designated smoke-free area faces a fine of 188 Turkish lira (~€9.29/$9.90/£8.22) and bar owners who fail to enforce the ban could be fined from 560 liras for a first offence up to 5,600 liras. The laws are enforced by the Ministry of Agriculture and Forestry of Turkey.

History
Smoking was first banned in 1997 in public buildings with more than four workers, as well as airplanes and public buses.

On 3 January 2008, Turkey passed a  smoking ban for all indoor spaces including bars, cafés and restaurants. It also bans smoking in sports stadia, and the gardens of mosques and hospitals.  The smoking ban came into force on 19 May 2008; however, bars, restaurants and cafes were exempted until mid-July 2009. On 19 July 2009, Turkey extended the indoor public smoking ban to include bars, restaurants, village coffeehouses and hookah bars.

The ban also forbids smoking advertising and the depiction of people smoking on television. Many foreign programmes or films that have scenes with characters smoking will usually have the cigarettes blurred out.  In December 2018 the law was changed to require plain packaging of all tobacco products. Health warnings messages and images must cover both sides of packages and at least 85% of the packaging.

Progress is still being made in educating the public about the law. Actual enforcement of the ban is still being implemented. The president of the Istanbul branch of the Environmental Engineers' Chamber (ÇMO), Eylem Tuncaelli, said that the smoking ban is a way for political leaders to avoid dealing with the country's real air pollution problems.

Prevalence
A Gallup poll  in May 2007  revealed that over half of Turks aged 15 to 49  had smoked on the day before the survey. This was the highest rate among the 100 countries surveyed, along with Lebanon (41%), Greece (40%), and Cuba (40%) in descending order. The figure went down to 12% in females and 40% in males in 2015, according to World Bank. Surprisingly, there is evidence to suggest that the rate of smoking among pregnant women in Turkey is between 8-12%. Whereas globally, smoking in pregnant women occurs in only about 1.7% of pregnancies.

In 2016, 24% of the Turkish population said they smoked. Turkey was ranked the 10th country with the most smokers in the world.

Illicit Tobacco
Turkey suffers from a severe and growing incidence of illicit tobacco consumption, spanning contraband and counterfeit tobacco products. In 2013 the estimated scale of illicit tobacco traffic in Turkey rose to 16.2 billion cigarettes per year.

According to the World Health Organization this problem is exacerbated by weak governance and a lack of high-level commitment to investigate and prosecute these crimes, ineffective customs and border controls, as well as complicity from within the tobacco industry, notably from the producers of precursor materials used in the manufacture of cigarettes. While the overall consumption of tobacco in Turkey has declined over the last thirty years, the price of cigarettes rose 4.17% annually between 1970 and 2006, driven in large part by successive layers of VAT and excise taxation.

The impact on street price for legitimate (taxed) products creates a lucrative market for illicit cigarettes that do not pay taxes and thus realize that margin as additional profit. Turkish security officials estimate the annual loss in tax revenue from illicit tobacco at around $9.5 billion. Counterfeit cigarettes are primarily purchased by younger and lower-income smokers, further exacerbating the health hazards universally acknowledged to be even worse than those associated with commercial tobacco products.

According to the European Parliament budget control committee, an estimated 40 percent of smuggled cigarettes sold in Turkey are produced in Bulgaria by the Bulgartabac company. These cigarettes are shipped first to Iraq, then smuggled into Turkey across the southeastern border. Methods of transit lean heavily on the exploitation of children in war-torn Syria.

Effect of laws
The sales of outdoor heaters have increased because entertainment venues provide heated outdoor seating for smokers.

In July 2009 a customer shot and killed the owner of a restaurant in the southwestern town of Saruhanli because he was angry that his cigarettes had been confiscated.

A member of the state media watchdog commented on the television blurring in 2010: "Hülya Alphas said the blurring effect being employed so frequently works against the ban because it increases attention attracted to smoking by disrupting the concentration of viewers."

See also

 Air pollution in Turkey

References

Turkey
Politics of Turkey
Health in Turkey